Brent Middleton (born 18 February 1954) is a New Zealand cricketer. He played in three first-class and two List A matches for Wellington from 1972 to 1974.

See also
 List of Wellington representative cricketers

References

External links
 

1954 births
Living people
New Zealand cricketers
Wellington cricketers
Cricketers from Lower Hutt